Aineh Jub (also Romanized as Ā'īneh Jūb and Ā'īnehjūb) is a village in Agahan Rural District, Kolyai District, Sonqor County, Kermanshah Province, Iran. At the 2006 census, its population was 75, in 21 families.

References 

Populated places in Sonqor County